Santiago Álvarez Fourcade (born 17 January 1994) is an Argentine professional rugby union footballer who plays as a centre for Argentina club CASI. At international honors, he was capped three times in 2013 for the Argentina national rugby union team. In his early career, he was selected to play in the 2013, and 2014 IRB Junior World Championship for Argentina and took part in the Argentina XV, the second national team in Argentina.

In rugby sevens, Álvarez made his World Rugby Sevens Series debut in Dubai in 2013. He has also medaled at both the 2015 and 2019 Pan American Games, played at the 2018 Rugby World Cup Sevens, and competed at the 2016 and 2020 Summer Olympics. Álvarez was also called up by Super Rugby franchise the Jaguares for the 2017 and 2018 Super Rugby competitions. However, he did not make any appearances.

References

External links 
 
 
 
 
 
 

1994 births
Living people
Male rugby sevens players
Argentine rugby union players
Olympic rugby sevens players of Argentina
Argentina international rugby sevens players
Rugby sevens players at the 2016 Summer Olympics
Sportspeople from Bahía Blanca
Pan American Games medalists in rugby sevens
Pan American Games silver medalists for Argentina
Rugby sevens players at the 2015 Pan American Games
Argentina international rugby union players
Rugby sevens players at the 2019 Pan American Games
Medalists at the 2019 Pan American Games
Medalists at the 2015 Pan American Games
Rugby sevens players at the 2020 Summer Olympics
Olympic medalists in rugby sevens
Medalists at the 2020 Summer Olympics
Olympic bronze medalists for Argentina
Jaguares (Super Rugby) players